Leukotriene C4 (LTC4) is a leukotriene. LTC4 has been extensively studied in the context of allergy and asthma. In cells of myeloid origin such as mast cells, its biosynthesis is orchestrated by translocation to the nuclear envelope along with co-localization of cytosolic phospholipase A2 (cPLA2), Arachidonate 5-lipoxygenase (5-LO), 5-lipoxygenase-activating protein (FLAP) and LTC4 synthase (LTC4S), which couples glutathione to an LTA4 intermediate. The MRP1 transporter then secretes cytosolic LTC4 and cell surface proteases further metabolize it by sequential cleavage of the γ-glutamyl and glycine residues off its glutathione segment, generating the more stable products LTD4 and LTE4. All three leukotrienes then bind at different affinities to two G-protein coupled receptors: CYSLTR1 and CYSLTR2, triggering pulmonary vasoconstriction and bronchoconstriction.

In cells of non-haematopoietic lineage, endoplasmic reticulum (ER) stress and chemotherapy induce LTC4 biosynthesis by transcriptionally upregulating and activating the enzyme microsomal glutathione-S-transferase 2 (MGST2). ER stress and chemotherapy also trigger nuclear translocation of the two LTC4 receptors. Acting in an intracrine manner, LTC4 then elicits nuclear translocation of NADPH oxidase 4 (NOX4), ROS accumulation and oxidative DNA damage. Besides being a potent lipid mediator in asthma and inflammation, LTC4 was reported to be involved in several other diseases, such as allergic airway diseases, dermatological diseases, cardiovascular diseases, liver injury, atherosclerosis and colon cancer.

References

Eicosanoids